Alberti is a common surname in Italian language and derives from given name Alberto, Latin translation of Germanic Albert. It may refer to:

Alberti (family), Florentine family
Achille Alberti (1860–1943), Italian sculptor
Aída Alberti (1915–2006), Argentine film actress 
Alberto di Giovanni Alberti (1525–1599), Italian architect and artist
Alessandro Alberti (1551–1590), Italian painter
Angela Alberti (born 1949), Italian gymnast
Barbara Alberti (born 1943), Italian writer, journalist, and screenwriter
Carlo Alberti (born 1959) is a retired Vancouver Columbus FC player and coach
Charly Alberti (born 1963), Argentine drummer, member of the rock band Soda Stereo
Cherubino Alberti (Borghegiano) (1553–1615), Italian engraver and painter
Domenico Alberti (c. 1710–1740), Italian composer and singer after whom the musical figuration known as the Alberti bass is named
Dorona Alberti (born 1975), Dutch singer and actress
Durante Alberti (1538–1613), Italian painter
Enrico Alberti (born 1947), Italian curler
Eva Allen Alberti (1856-1938), American dramatics teacher
Friedrich August von Alberti (1795–1878), paleontologist
Gasparo Alberti (c. 1480 – c. 1560), Italian composer
George Alberti (born 1937), British doctor
Gerlando Alberti (1923–2012), known as "", a member of the Sicilian Mafia
Giovanni Alberti (painter) (1558-1601), Italian painter
Giuseppe Matteo Alberti (1685–1751), Italian composer and violinist
Ignaz Alberti (1760–1794), Austrian illustrator, engraver and book printer
Innocentio Alberti (c. 1535–1615), Italian composer and instrumentalist
Irvin Alberti, Dominican comedian and actor
Johann Friedrich Alberti (1642–1710), German composer and organist
Jorge Alberti (born 1978), Puerto Rican actor
Leandro Alberti (1479 – c. 1552), Italian Dominican historian
Leon Battista Alberti (1404–1472), Prominent Italian Renaissance polymath and architect, active in many fields
Lucía Alberti, radical feminist and Argentinian politician
Luis Alberti (1906–1976), Dominican Merengue musician, arranger, conductor, and author of songs
Manuel Alberti, 19th-century Argentine priest and politician
Mario Alberti (born 1965), Italian comic book artist and writer
Maryse Alberti (born 1954), French cinematographer
Micah Alberti (born 1984), American television actor
Peter Adler Alberti (1851–1932), Danish politician
Pietro Cesare Alberti (1608–1655), First Italian in New Amsterdam, regarded as the first Italian-American
Rafael Alberti (1902–1999), Spanish poet
Silvio Alberti, Italian race car driver
Susan Alberti (born 1947), Australian businesswoman, philanthropist and former Vice President of the Western Bulldogs Football Club
Tito Alberti (1923–2009), Argentine jazz drummer
Viola Alberti (1868-1957), American actress
Willeke Alberti, Dutch singer, daughter of Willy Alberti
Willy Alberti (1926–1985), Dutch singer, father of Willeke Alberti

Italian-language surnames
Patronymic surnames
Surnames from given names

de:Alberti